Murr is a municipality in the district of Ludwigsburg, Baden-Württemberg, Germany. It is situated on the river Murr, 2 km upstream from its confluence with the Neckar and about 9 km northeast of Ludwigsburg.

Geography

Geographical location 
Murr lies in the Neckar Basin in 196 to 261 meters height at the Murr, two kilometers before it flows into the Neckar and about twelve kilometers north of Ludwigsburg. An uninhabited exclave in the Hardtwald near Rielingshausen is attributed to the natural area Swabian-Franconian Forest.

Neighbouring communities 
Neighboring municipalities are Pleidelsheim in the west, Marbach in the south and Benningen am Neckar in the southwest, as well as Steinheim an der Murr in the east, which merges directly into the municipal area of Murr.

Municipal structure 
To Murr belong the village Murr and the farmstead Sonnenhof.

Areal Distribution 

According to Data of the Statistischen Landesamtes, Stand 2014.

Politics

City Council 
The municipal council in Murr has 14 members. The municipal elections on May 26, 2019 led to the following result. The municipal council consists of the elected honorary municipal councillors and the mayor as chairman. The mayor is entitled to vote in the municipal council.

Mayor 
Torsten Bartzsch (independent) is mayor of the municipality of Murr since July 1, 2012. He was elected on April 22, 2012, in the first ballot with 72.26% of the votes and confirmed in office on April 26, 2020, with 95.36% of the votes. His predecessor was Manfred Hollenbach (CDU), who served as mayor from 1972 to 2012.

Crest and flag 
The municipal coat of arms is under a golden shield head, in it a black stag pole, split by gold and red, in front a red chalice, in the back an upright golden hafthorn with green shackle pointing to the splitting. The municipal flag is red-yellow and was awarded on April 18, 1980.

Notable People 
 Marcus Ziegler (* 1973), former professional footballer (VfB Stuttgart)

References

Ludwigsburg (district)